Product structure is a hierarchical decomposition of a product, typically known as the bill of materials (BOM).
As business becomes more responsive to unique consumer tastes and derivative products grow to meet the unique configurations, BOM management can become unmanageable. For manufacturers, a bill of materials (BOM) is a critical product information record that lists the raw materials, assemblies, components, parts and the quantities of each needed to manufacture a product.

Advanced modeling techniques are necessary to cope with configurable products where changing a small part of a product can have multiple impacts on other product structure models. Concepts within this entry are in capital letters in order to indicate these concepts.

Several concepts are related to the subject of product structure modeling. All these concepts are discussed in this section. These concepts are divided into two main aspects. First the product breakdown is discussed which involves all the physical aspects of a product. Second, different views at the product structure are indicated.

Product breakdown

Figure 1 illustrates the concepts that are important to the structure of a product. This is a meta-data model, which can be used for modeling the instances in a specific case of product structuring.
The core of the product structure is illustrated by the product components (items) and their relationships. Thus, this involves the linking between items related to the product.
The assembly can consist of subassemblies and parts, whereas subassemblies can also consist of other subassemblies or part. Thus, this is typically hierarchically ordered. These concepts are generalized into the concept of item. This classification is overlapping, because a subassembly could be a part in another assembly configuration.
Due to differentiation and variation of items several concepts must be indicated into the product breakdown structure. Three concepts are involved in this differentiation, namely alternatives, variants and revisions. An alternative of an item is considered as a substitute for that particular item, whereas a variant is another option of an item which the consumer can choose. When an error occurs at a part or subassembly, it needs to be revised. This revision indicates the change history of the item.

Product structure views

Product structure views are made upon several activity domains within the company. Due to the fact not everyone in the company has to have a detailed overview of the product several components with their attributes can be extracted.
When the Master Structure is made out of the several items of the product assembly, multiple views can be made upon this Master Structure. Thus this Master Structure contains every item in detail, which is important to the Assembly of the product.

The modeling process
The process of constructing the product model consists of six main activities, which can be decomposed in several sub-activities. The next table describes these activities and the sub-activities within them provided with a description about this activity.

Process-data model
When combining the activities with the concepts of the product structure model it will result in a process-data diagram. This diagram displays the steps which need to be taken within the process of product structure modeling together with the deliverables, at the right side, which are outcomes of these activities.

Example
This example discusses the product structure modeling within car manufacturing. This will be discussed through the main activities which are identified within the process of product structure modeling.

Define product components
First, all components are identified and indicated. In the area of car manufacturing, the product components are as follows. A car (ASSEMBLY) consists of several SUBASSEMBLIES such as the body and the engine of the car. The engine for example is assembled in several parts such as screws and small pipes.

Define product assortment
In case of car manufacturing instances of these concepts can be made. For example an engine has several alternatives. For example a car manufacturer can choose between an engine made in America or Japan.
Within these different engines, variants exist. Initially an engine can be made as a 1.6 engine, but a variant, such as a 1.8 engine, can be made of this engine. Thus the 1.6 engine is used as base concept for the new 1.8 engine.

Product structuring
An example of a correlation between items within car manufacturing can be indicated as follows. The engine is connected to the body with several screws. Thus, these two items must be linked by the concept of a relationship.

Create master structure
After structuring the product with all the listed items and relationship between them this must be combined into one MASTER STRUCTURE which contains all of the details of the product. In case of the car, all items from engine to screw must be documented in one MASTER STRUCTURE.

Documenting
When the MASTER STRUCTURE of the car is created one must link this structure with documents which contains the product definition of this specific car. Primarily, this consists of an extensive description of the car which is linked to the MASTER STRUCTURE of this product.

Define product structure views
In case of the car manufacturer multiple views can be derived from the car assembly. For example a structure from a sales point of view will need more detail about the functions and characteristics of the car rather than detailed information about the body. Thus a sales manager needs information about the color of the car or the type of gear (automatic of manual).
From a purchasing view more information is needed about the mixing of the paint instead of the general color, which is only needed for the customer. Purchasing department also needs more information about the suppliers of the used components within the manufacturing of the car, so they can easily overview where which component is used and which supplier it comes from.

 See also 
 ISO 10303
 Assembly modeling
 Bill of materials (BOM)
 Product breakdown structure

 Bibliography 
 Hvam, L. (1999). A procedure for building product models. Robotics and Computer-Integrated Manufacturing, 15, pp. 77-87
 Peltonen, H. (2000), Concepts and an Implementation for Product Data Management. Acta Polytechnica Scandinavica, Mathematics and Computing Series No. 105, pp. 188
 Rampersad, H.K. (1995). Concentric Design of Robotic Assembly Systems. Journal of Manufacturing Systems, 14(4), pp. 230-243
 Svensson, D., & Malmqvist, J. (2002). Strategies for Product Structure Management at Manufacturing Firms. Journal of Computing and Information Science in Engineering, 2''(1), 50-58.

References

Computer-aided design
Product lifecycle management